Melissa Ann Francis (born December 12, 1972) is an American television news personality who most recently appeared as an anchor and commentator for the Fox Business Network (FBN) and Fox News (FNC). Previously, she worked as an actress.

Prior to FBN, she worked at CNBC. She had been the co-host of After The Bell weekday afternoons with Connell MacShane. She also was most recently an anchor on FNC's Happening Now newscast. She most recently had been a regular panelist on FNC's afternoon talk show Outnumbered. However, in late October 2020, it was reported that she had been pushed out of Fox. Although there was not a formal announcement to that effect, all signs point to her having departed Fox, likely not on her terms.

Education 
Born and raised in Los Angeles, Francis graduated from Harvard University in 1995 with a Bachelor of Arts degree in economics.

Career

Acting 
Francis started her acting career on television by appearing in a Johnson & Johnson shampoo commercial at 6 months old. She was known for her role as Cassandra Cooper Ingalls on Little House on the Prairie, for two seasons. Other television appearances include two series regular roles: Morningstar/Eveningstar and Joe’s World, and three films including Man, Woman and Child, where she played Paula Beckwith. She has also had appearances in the television series St. Elsewhere in 1986 and the 1988 film Bad Dreams, where she played young Cynthia. Melissa appeared in nearly 100 commercials during her acting career. She is reportedly the inspiration for the fictional character Avery Jessup (conceived of and played by Elizabeth Banks) in the show 30 Rock, although Banks herself has denied this.

Journalism
Francis has worked as a reporter for CNBC and CNET.

In January 2012, Francis became an anchor for Fox Business Network.

In 2014, Francis became a recurring co-host of Fox News Channel's talk and news commentary program, Outnumbered. She also anchored FNC's Happening Now newscast.

Departure from Fox

In late October 2020, it was reported that Francis had been pushed out at Fox. She had not been seen on the network since early in the month. Her contract had expired about a year earlier and had not been renewed. 
The only communication on the issue from Francis herself came in a tweet, where she thanked her followers for their support. However, her profile on Twitter soon dropped any reference to Fox as well.

In late 2020, Francis filed a pay discrimination action against Fox.  Francis claimed that Fox News underpaid her compared to her male colleagues, and she initiated legal claims against Fox.   Fox and Francis reached a settlement in June 2022 whereby Fox paid Francis $15 million.

Writer
Francis authored a book in November 2012, Diary of a Stage Mother's Daughter: A Memoir, concerning the trials, tribulations and joys of having an overbearing mother; and in April 2017, published Lessons from the Prairie, relating childhood experiences from the show as applied to her adult life.

Filmography

Film

Television

References

External links

Fox Business bio

Melissa Francis: Lessons From The Prairie
 

1972 births
Living people
American child actresses
American television actresses
Actresses from Los Angeles
Harvard College alumni
American women journalists
CNBC people
20th-century American actresses
Fox News people
Fox Business people